Kafr Kalbin is a village in northern Syria, administratively part of the A'zaz District of Aleppo Governorate, located northeast of Aleppo. Nearby localities include A'zaz to the northwest, Jarez to northeast and Kaljibrin to the southeast.

Demographics
According to the Syria Central Bureau of Statistics, Kafr Kalbin had a population of 2,146 in the 2004 census. In late 19th century, traveler Martin Hartmann noted Kafar Kalbin as a settled Arab village of 20 houses.

References

Populated places in Azaz District